Guillermo C. "Bill" Gramática (born 10 July 1978) is a former American football placekicker in the National Football League for the Arizona Cardinals and Miami Dolphins. He also was a member of the Tampa Bay Storm in the Arena Football League. He was drafted by the Arizona Cardinals in the fourth round of the 2001 NFL Draft. He played college football at the University of South Florida. Gramática is perhaps best known for tearing a knee ligament in a celebratory leap in 2001.

Early years
Gramática was born in Buenos Aires, Argentina, to Laura and William Gramática. Bill is the younger brother to fellow placekicker Martin Gramática and older brother to Santiago Gramática. Laura and William Gramática decided to move their family from Argentina to LaBelle, Florida, in 1983. Bill graduated from LaBelle High School, as did his two brothers.

As a senior in 1995, he made 15-of-20 field goals and 44-of-45 extra points, tying a school record with a 52-yard field goal. He received first-team Class 3A All-State and honorable-mention USA Today All-American honors.

College career
Gramática accepted a football scholarship from Florida State University. He was redshirted, while senior Scott Bentley finished his college eligibility. As a redshirt freshman in 1997, he competed with true freshman Sebastian Janikowski for the stating placekicker job. He began the first 4 games of the season as the starter, showing inconsistency by making 2-of-4 (50%) on field goals and 10-of-12 (83%) on extra points. He was passed on the depth chart by Janikowski, asked head coach Bobby Bowden to be released from his scholarship and left school.

On October 7, 1997, he announced that he was transferring to Division I-AA University of South Florida. As a sophomore in 1998, he set school records with 16-of-24 field goals made (66%), 46-of-47 extra points made (97%) and 94 scored points. He received second-team Division I-AA All-American honors.

As a junior in 1999, he was limited with a groin injury and posted 4-of-5 field goals (80%). Tony Umholz replaced him in the games he missed.

As a senior in 2000, he made 16-of-24 field goal attempts (66.7%), 29-of-30 extra points (96.7%), 77 scored points and 6 punts with a 33.7-yard average. In the season finale against Austin Peay State University, he set a school record and tied a Division I-AA record with a 63-yard field goal. In 2001, after his graduation, he was replaced with his younger brother Santiago, who became a four-year starter and made 38 field goals.

Gramática finished his college career after setting most of the kicking records at the University of South Florida, among them, 36 career field goals, 67.9% career field goal accuracy, 85 career extra points, 193 career points, longest field goal (63 yards), 8 consecutive field goals made and 45 consecutive extra points made. On July 22, 2016, he was named to the school's all-time team.

Professional career

Arizona Cardinals
Gramática was selected by the Arizona Cardinals in the fourth round (98th overall) of the 2001 NFL Draft. As a rookie, he passed Cary Blanchard on the depth chart and his NFL career began with promising results. On December 15, in the thirteenth game against the New York Giants, he injured himself, after jumping up in celebration of a 42-yard made field goal and tearing his right ACL upon landing. Even though he was seriously injured, he still kicked one field goal and 2 extra points, while Pat Tillman did the kickoffs. On December 18, he was placed on the injured reserve list. He was replaced with Cedric Oglesby. He finished the season with 16-of-20 field goals (80%) and 25-of-25 extra points (100%). He made 4 field goals in one game against the Oakland Raiders. He set a franchise rookie record with 73 points scored.

In 2002, he regained his starting job, registering 15-of-21 field goals (71.4%) and 29-of-29 extra points (100%).

In 2003, he made 3-of-4 field goals (75%) and 6-of-6 extra points (100%). On November 19, he was placed on the injured reserve list with a back injury. He was replaced with Tim Duncan. He was not re-signed after the season.

New York Giants
On May 14, 2004, he was signed as a free agent by the New York Giants, to compete for the starting job against Matt Bryant. He was passed on the depth chart by Steve Christie and was released on August 31.

Miami Dolphins
On November 6, 2004, he was signed as a free agent by the Miami Dolphins, to replace an injured Olindo Mare. He played in one game and was cut from the team on November 10, after making 3-of-3 field goals, but also missing his first career extra point kick, which came in a one-point loss (23-24) against his former team the Arizona Cardinals.

Gramática finished his professional career posting 37-of-48 field goals (77.1%) and 60-of-61 extra point (98.4%) attempts.

Tampa Bay Storm (AFL)
On October 19, 2005, he was signed by the Tampa Bay Storm of the Arena Football League, after being out of football. In 2006, he made 12-of-30 field goal attempts (seventh in the league) and 94-of-108 extra points attempts (eight in the league). He was waived on March 6, 2007.

Personal life
During his time with the New Orleans Saints, Martin Gramática witnessed the devastation Hurricane Katrina left and wanted to give back once his career came to an end. Together, Martin and Bill searched for a product to build houses out of that could withstand the forces of a hurricane; joined by former USF kicker Santiago Gramática, the Gramática family founded SIPS International in 2009, providing a full line of services involving Structural Insulated Panel Systems (SIPS). Such panels provide an environmentally friendly protection against extreme weather conditions like hurricanes, earthquakes, and other hazardous weather. The family has built resistant, affordable houses in cities like New Orleans and Tampa, along with countries like Israel, Argentina, and Haiti. "It's really been rewarding to help out," Bill stated in an article for AZCentral.com. "We're doing our best to find people to donate one building, one school, one village. There is no better feeling than knowing you've made a positive impact in someone's life. It is our responsibility and privilege to help provide a safer, more energy efficient product that will reduce the cost of ownership."

While in the Tampa Bay area, the Gramática brothers saw the need to support deserving members of their community, especially combat wounded veterans. Through partnerships with other organizations, they raise awareness and support bay area veterans returning from combat duty that may face health and financial challenges. In order to assist a greater number of worthy local residents, the Gramáticas have founded the Gramática Family Foundation; a non-profit whose mission is to provide energy efficient housing initiatives and development assistance to disabled military veterans, the underprivileged, and the ailing.

Notes

References

1978 births
Living people
Argentine players of American football
American football placekickers
South Florida Bulls football players
Arizona Cardinals players
Sportspeople from Buenos Aires
Argentine emigrants to the United States
People from Hendry County, Florida
Players of American football from Florida
LaBelle High School alumni
Miami Dolphins players